The 2010–11 Texas A&M Aggies men's basketball team represented Texas A&M University in the 2010-11 NCAA Division I men's basketball season. Mark Turgeon returned for his fourth year as coach of the Aggies after renegotiating his contract to stay in College Station. The team played its home games in Reed Arena and are members of the Big 12 Conference. They finished the season 24–9, 12–6 in Big 12 play and lost in the semifinals of the 2011 Big 12 men's basketball tournament to their rival Texas. They received an at-large berth in the 2011 NCAA Division I men's basketball tournament where they lost in the second round to Florida State.

Previous season

The Aggies finished the previous year with a 24-10 record and a second-round appearance in the NCAA tournament–one of only two programs in the country to win a game in the tournament each of the previous five years.

Preseason

Player departures 
The Aggies will be without guard Donald Sloan and forward Bryan Davis, both of whom graduated as members of the winningest class in Texas A&M history, with 100 victories over four years. Guard Derrick Roland broke his tibia and fibula in a game on December 22, 2009 and missed the rest of the season. Although he used up his four years of NCAA athletic eligibility, he filed a medical redshirt appeal to get an extra year, but was denied.

Recruiting 

|-
| colspan="7" style="padding-left:10px;" | Overall Recruiting Rankings:
|}

Roster

Schedule 

|-
!colspan=9 style=|Exhibition

|-
!colspan=9 style=|Regular season

 
    
    
    
    

    
    
    
    
    
   
   
    
    
   
    
   
    
    

|-
!colspan=9 style=| Big 12 Tournament
 
 
|-
!colspan=9 style=| NCAA Tournament

References 

Texas A&M Aggies men's basketball seasons
Texas AandM
Texas AandM